Kenneth C. Froewiss was a Clinical Professor of Finance at the New York University Stern School of Business, and specialized investment banking, mergers and acquisitions, and corporate governance.  Professor Froewiss also taught for the TRIUM Global Executive MBA Program, an alliance of NYU Stern, the London School of Economics and HEC School of Management, and served as Academic Director of Executive Programs at NYU Stern.

Biography
Prior to joining Stern in 1997, Froewiss was a Managing Director in the investment banking area of JP Morgan Chase, and was responsible for the firm’s relationships with insurance company and mutual fund clients in North America.  He advised on many merger and restructuring transactions in the financial services industry, and was involved in public and private offerings of securities for a variety of companies.  Earlier in his career, Professor Froewiss worked as an economist in the bond-trading area of JP Morgan Chase and Goldman Sachs and as a member of the Research Department at the Federal Reserve Bank of San Francisco.  He is currently a member of the board of directors of several mutual funds and of an insurance company.

Publications
Froewiss has published numerous articles and reviews in a variety of economic journals.

Education
Professor Froewiss received his Ph.D. in Economics from Harvard University, where he also did his undergraduate work in economics.  He studied for a year at the Indian Statistical Institute on a Rotary International Fellowship and served in the United States Army as a Russian translator.

References

External links
NYU Stern Biography
Department of Economics Biography
TRIUM Global Executive MBA Program

New York University Stern School of Business faculty
American economists
Year of birth missing (living people)
Living people
Harvard Graduate School of Arts and Sciences alumni